Frederick W. Strahorn (born March 20, 1965) is an American Democratic politician who served in the Ohio House of Representatives, representing the 39th District, which consists of much of Dayton, Ohio.  He served as the Minority Leader for the 131st Ohio General Assembly and 132nd Ohio General Assembly.

Life and career
Strahorn served as a member of the Wright State University Board of Trustees, a position that ended in 2013. He attended Embry-Riddle Aeronautical University and graduated with a B.A. in aviation management from Ohio State University. He also attended Sinclair Community College for real estate coursework. He is single. and has one daughter.

Strahorn won his election to the Ohio House of Representatives in 2000 and was re-elected in 2002, 2004 and 2006. Strahorn was term limited out of running again in his previous district, but chose to run for election in a different district in 2012. In 2009, Strahorn was appointed to the Ohio Senate to replace Tom Roberts, who had been appointed to the Ohio Civil Rights Commission, but lost election to a full term to Republican Bill Beagle.

Return to the Ohio House of Representatives
Strahorn was chosen as the Democratic candidate for the position on August 12, 2012, at the Montgomery County Democratic headquarters, with a vote of 41-1.

First elected in November 2012, Strahorn defeated his opponent, Jeffrey Wellbaum, with over 80% of the vote in a traditionally Democratic district. The two competed to fill the position that had been vacated in January 2013 by Clayton Luckie, who had earlier announced his withdrawal from the election following the news that he was being investigated on criminal charges.

Strahorn soundly won re-election in 2014 with over 75% of the vote. His opponents were Jeff Dalton, Republican, and William Pace, an independent perennial candidate.

On November 18, 2014, Strahorn was elected as Minority Leader of the Ohio House by the Democratic Caucus. Strahorn stated that he would work on trying to make clear the Democratic Party's message to voters, commenting "I know that we have work to do with the general public with communicating what our party really stands for." He was reelected to the position in 2016.

Awards and Recognitions

Strahorn received the Dayton Unit NAACP President's Award from Dayton NAACP President Derrick Foward in 2008.

Electoral history

References

External links
Fred Strahorn - The Ohio House of Representatives
Ballotpedia - Fred Strahorn
Ohio Votes - Fred Strahorn

1965 births
20th-century African-American people
21st-century African-American politicians
21st-century American politicians
African-American state legislators in Ohio
Embry–Riddle Aeronautical University alumni
Living people
Democratic Party members of the Ohio House of Representatives
Democratic Party Ohio state senators
Ohio State University College of Engineering alumni
Politicians from Cincinnati
Politicians from Dayton, Ohio
Sinclair Community College alumni